A lummox is a clumsy or stupid person.

Lummox may also refer to:

 Lummox, a 1923 novel by Fannie Hurst
 Lummox (film), a 1930 film adaptation of the novel
 Lummox, the title character of the novel The Star Beast by Robert Heinlein
 Lummox, Rachel